WCSA may refer to:

 Wesleyan Council on Student Affairs
 Wolfson College Student Association
 Working-Class Studies Association
 Worle Community School Academy, a secondary school in the South West of England.
 World Complexity Science Academy
 World Crossbow Shooting Association, one of the two major crossbow federations. World Championship disciplines: Target, Target match play, Forest, Forest match play, 3D, Bench & prone target and Indoor target.
 WCSA (AM), a defunct radio station (1260 AM) formerly licensed to serve Ripley, Mississippi, United States